Daniel Enrique Arismendi Marchán (born 4 July 1982) is a Venezuelan footballer who coaches and plays as a striker for Orlando City Soccer School Hunters Creek in the United Premier Soccer League.

Club career
According to English press, Arismendi was pursued by Premier League club Wigan Athletic and has been monitored by clubs in Mexico for some time.

International career
Arismendi scored two goals for his country in a 2010 FIFA World Cup qualifier against Bolivia in Maracaibo.

Arismendi has played 31 games for the Venezuela national team, scoring 11 goals.

Also participated in the 2007 Copa América in Venezuela, where he was called by Richard Páez and reached the second round, finishing sixth in the tournament. With the new coach Cesar Farías, who arrived in 2008 Arismendi had no continuity with Richard if he had.

In 2020, Arismendi is playing for United Premier Soccer League club Celta USA. He scored the game-winning goal in a 1-0 inter-club derby win against Celta Gunners.

International goals

|-
| 1. || September 29, 2006 || José Pachencho Romero, Maracaibo, Venezuela ||  || 1–0 || 1-0 || Friendly
|-
| 2. || February 7, 2007 || José Pachencho Romero, Maracaibo, Venezuela ||  || 2–0 || 2-0 || Friendly
|-
| 3. || February 28, 2007 || Qualcomm Stadium, San Diego, United States ||  || 3–1 || 3-1 || Friendly
|-
| 4. || May 25, 2007 || Metropolitano de Mérida, Mérida, Venezuela ||  || 2–0 || 2-1 || Friendly
|-
| 5. || June 30, 2007 || Pueblo Nuevo, San Cristóbal, Venezuela ||  || 2–0 || 2-0 || 2007 Copa América
|-
| 6. || November 20, 2007 || Pueblo Nuevo, San Cristóbal, Venezuela ||  || 1–1 || 5-3 || 2010 FIFA World Cup qualification
|-
| 7. || November 20, 2007 || Pueblo Nuevo, San Cristóbal, Venezuela ||  || 2–2 || 5-3 || 2010 FIFA World Cup qualification
|-
| 8. || September 8, 2007 || Polideportivo Cachamay, Puerto Ordaz, Venezuela ||  || 1–2 || 3-2 || Friendly
|-
| 9. || June 9, 2008 || Ergilio Hato, Willemstad, Netherlands Antilles ||  || 0–1 || 0-1 || Friendly
|-
| 10. || March 16, 2011 || Estadio del Bicentenario, San Juan, Argentina ||  || 1–1 || 4-1 || Friendly
|-
| 11. || June 11, 2011 || Sam Boyd Stadium, Las Vegas, United States ||  || 0–2 || 0-3 || Friendly
|}

References

External links
 
 

1982 births
Living people
People from Cumaná
Venezuelan footballers
Venezuela international footballers
2007 Copa América players
2011 Copa América players
A.C.C.D. Mineros de Guayana players
UA Maracaibo players
Deportivo Miranda F.C. players
Carabobo F.C. players
Atlante F.C. footballers
Deportivo Táchira F.C. players
Deportivo Anzoátegui players
C.D. Antofagasta footballers
Juan Aurich footballers
Zulia F.C. players
Deportes Concepción (Chile) footballers
Venezuelan Primera División players
Chilean Primera División players
Liga MX players
Peruvian Primera División players
United Premier Soccer League players
Venezuelan expatriate footballers
Expatriate footballers in Chile
Expatriate footballers in Mexico
Expatriate footballers in Peru
Venezuelan expatriate sportspeople in Chile
Venezuelan expatriate sportspeople in Mexico
Venezuelan expatriate sportspeople in Peru
Association football forwards